The 2018 season is Buriram United's 7th season in the Thai League. The club enters the season as the Thai League champions, and will participate in the 2018 Thai League. They are the defending champions and will also participate in the FA Cup, League Cup, Champions Cup and AFC Champions League.

Club information

Squad information

Transfers

In

Out

Loan in

Loan out

Kit

Domestic competitions
Supplier: Made by club / Sponsor: Chang

ACL special
Supplier: Warrix Sports / Sponsor: Chang

Competitions

Overview

Champions Cup

Thai League

League table

Results summary

Results by matchday

Matches

FA Cup

League Cup

AFC Champions League

Buriram United qualified for the Group Stage of the 2018 AFC Champions League due to finishing champion in the 2017 Thai League.

Group stage

Buriram United is staying on group G, with Guangzhou Evergrande  (2017 Chinese Super League champion), Jeju United (2017 K League Classic runners-up), and Cerezo Osaka (2017 J.League Cup champion).

Knockout stage
Round of 16

Statistics

Appearances

Goalscorers
Includes all competitive matches. The list is sorted by shirt number when total goals are equal.
Correct as of match played on 27 October 2018

Clean sheets
The list is sorted by shirt number when total clean sheets are equal. Numbers in parentheses represent games where both goalkeepers participated and both kept a clean sheet; the number in parentheses is awarded to the goalkeeper who was substituted on, whilst a full clean sheet is awarded to the goalkeeper who was on the field at the start of play.

Correct as of match played on 27 October 2018

References

External links
 Buriram United official website
 Thai League website

Bur
2018